Aberdeen Central was a burgh constituency in the city of Aberdeen in Scotland which was represented in the House of Commons of the Parliament of the United Kingdom. It was created for the 1997 general election and returned one Member of Parliament (MP) by the first past the post system until it was abolished for  the 2005 general election.

History
Upon the boundary review in time for the 2005 election, the seat was abolished, with most of the seat joining Aberdeen North, except for Queen's Cross, Gilcomston and Langstane which joined Aberdeen South.

Boundaries
The City of Aberdeen District electoral divisions of Cairncry, Causewayend, Linksfield, Rosemount, Rubislaw, St Machar, St Nicholas, and Woodside.

As its name suggested, Aberdeen Central centred on the centre of Aberdeen, the boundaries generally being, but not precisely, the River Dee and River Don and the Anderson Drive ring-road.

Members of Parliament

Elections

Elections in the 1990s

Elections in the 2000s

References

Historic parliamentary constituencies in Scotland (Westminster)
Constituencies of the Parliament of the United Kingdom established in 1997
Constituencies of the Parliament of the United Kingdom disestablished in 2005
Politics of Aberdeen